The Lonesome Picker Rides Again is the fourth album by the folk musician John Stewart, a former member of the Kingston Trio, released in 1971. The album contains Stewart's own recording of "Daydream Believer", a song he wrote for The Monkees. Their version was released as a single and reached the number one in the U.S. Billboard Hot 100 chart in December 1967, remaining there for four weeks.

Track listing
All compositions by John Stewart.

Side one
 "Just an Old Love Song" – 3:15
 "The Road Shines Bright" – 2:35
 "Touch of the Sun" – 3:06
 "Bolinas" – 3:18
 "Freeway Pleasure" – 3:14
 "Swift Lizard" – 3:22

Side two
 "Wolves in the Kitchen" – 3:25
 "Little Road and a Stone to Roll" – 2:52
 "Daydream Believer" – 3:28
 "Crazy" – 3:27
 "Wild Horse Road" – 2:50
 "All the Brave Horses" – 4:38

Recorded at Western Recorders and Crystal Sound in Hollywood, except for tracks 1:6 and 2:1 which were recorded live at Chuck's Cellar in Los Altos, California, on 29 May 1971 by Wally Heider. The location engineer was Ray Thompson. The album was mixed at Independence Recorders in Studio City, California.

Personnel
 John Stewart – vocals, guitar
 Russ Kunkel – drums
 Peter Asher – vocals
 Bryan Garofalo – bass guitar
 Michael Stewart  – vocals
 Jennifer Warnes - vocals
 Buffy Ford – vocals
 Chris Darrow – banjo, electric dobro
 Fred Carter Jr. – guitar
 Henry Diltz – harmonica
 Buddy Emmons – steel guitar
 Glen Hardin – piano
 King Errisson – conga
 Leland Sklar – bass

Production personnel
 Mike Stewart - producer
 Ron Malo - productions engineer, mixdown engineer
 Richard Sanford Orshoff - productions engineer
 Jimmie Haskell - orchestration
 Henry Diltz - photography
 David Clarke - art direction

References

1971 albums
John Stewart (musician) albums
Warner Records albums
Albums produced by Michael Stewart (musician)